The San Fernando Formation is a geologic formation in Trinidad and Tobago. The open marine claystones preserve fossils dating back to the Oligocene period.

See also 
 List of fossiliferous stratigraphic units in Trinidad and Tobago

References

Further reading 
 R. M. Stainforth. 1948. Description, correlation, and paleoecology of Tertiary Cipero Marl, Trinidad, BWI. Bulletin of the American Association of Petroleum Geologists 32(7):1292-1330

Geologic formations of Trinidad and Tobago
Paleogene Trinidad and Tobago
Shale formations
Open marine deposits
San Fernando, Trinidad and Tobago